K-145 was a  state highway in the U.S. state of Kansas. K-145's western terminus was at U.S. Route 83 (US-83) and US-160 west of the city of Sublette and the eastern terminus was at US-56 in Sublette.

K-145 was designated a state highway in 1939, to a highway from US-83 east to K-45 in Sublette. On June 27, 1956, K-45 was decommissioned and became US-56. Then in 1965, K-145 was decommissioned as a state highway.

Route description
K-145 began at US-83 and US-160 and began travelling east. It then passed to the north of a small group of houses, and after 1 it intersected County Road NN. From here, it continued east as it entered Sublette and became Haws Avenue. It continued through the city until it reached North Inman Street, where it turned south. It started south along North Inman Street through a residential neighborhood, then reached its eastern terminus at US-56.

History
K-145 was designated in a January 4, 1939 resolution, to a highway from US-83 and US-160 east to K-45 in Sublette. On June 27, 1956, K-45 was decommissioned and became US-56. Then in an April 23, 1965 resolution, K-145 was decommissioned as a state highway.

Major intersections

References

External links

Kansas Department of Transportation State Map
KDOT: Historic State Maps

145